Dean LeRoy McAdams (October 3, 1917 – January 10, 1996) was an American football player who played three seasons with the Brooklyn Dodgers of the National Football League (NFL). He was drafted by the Dodgers with the eighth overall pick of the 1941 NFL Draft. He played college football at the University of Washington and attended Caldwell High School in Caldwell, Idaho.

References

External links
Just Sports Stats

1917 births
1996 deaths
American football running backs
Washington Huskies football players
Brooklyn Dodgers (NFL) players
Players of American football from Idaho
People from Caldwell, Idaho